Choong Eui Song (born January 15, 1955) is a South Korean organic chemist.

Biography 
Song was born and raised in Seoul. He received his B.S. degree from Chung-Ang University in 1980, and received a diploma (1985) and a Ph.D. (1988) at RWTH Aachen University in Germany.

After completing his Ph.D., he worked as Principal Research Scientist at the Korea Institute of Science and Technology (KIST). In 2001, he was appointed as a head of the National Research Laboratory for Green Chirotechnology in Korea. In 2004, he moved to Sungkyunkwan University (Department of Chemistry) as a full professor. In 2005, he was elected as the vice-president of Korean Chemical Society. From 2006 to 2014 he worked as a director at the Research Institute of Advanced Nanomaterials (University-centered Lab, Korea Research Foundation). In 2016 he was appointed as a director of National Research Laboratory for Chiral Organic Molecular Materials in Korea.

He has been visiting professors for several universities/institutes in the worlds, including:

Max-Planck-Institut fuer Kohlenforschung, Mülheim, Germany, 2010
University of Southampton, England, 2015

He served as a technical advisor to the Samsung Advanced Institute of Technology, Dongwoo Fine-Chem and Hansol Chemical. He has been a board member of Kyongbo Pharmaceuticals s since 2015.

His research has been focused on asymmetric organocatalysis, biomimetic catalysis, artificial enzyme, on-water catalysis and on-droplet catalysis. His current research also focuses on prebiotic chemistry, specifically, the origin of homochirality (chirality amplification process).

Honors and awards 
He has received several scientific awards including:

The Korean 52 Research Scientists (Ministry of Science and Technology (South Korea), 1998)
The Scientist of the Month Award (Korea Institute of Science and Technology, 2000)
The Scientist of the Month Award of Korea (Ministry of Science and Technology (South Korea), 2001)
The distinguished contribution award for new drug development (Korea Drug Research Association, 2004)
Academic Excellence Grand Prize (Korean Chemical Society, 2013)
Academic Excellence Grand Prize Korean Society of Organic Synthesis, 2017)

In 2018, he was elected to the Korean Academy of Science and Technology.

References

1955 births
Living people
Chung-Ang University alumni
RWTH Aachen University alumni
Academic staff of Sungkyunkwan University
South Korean chemists
Organic chemists